The Afterparty is an American murder mystery comedy television series created by Christopher Miller that premiered on Apple TV+ on January 28, 2022. In March 2022 the series was renewed for a second season, which is set to premiere on April 28, 2023.

Premise
The series takes place at a high school reunion after party with each episode "a different character's perspective" of what happened that night. Critic Olivia Rutigliano noted that it is an example of "the millennial whodunnit," a new subgenre of murder mystery in which the investigation is a vehicle for characters to find second chances, personal fulfillment, and a departure from boring or oppressive daily life (through the feeling that their life has become a new genre).

Cast and characters

Main

 Tiffany Haddish as Detective Danner, a detective investigating Xavier's murder
 Sam Richardson as Aniq, an escape room designer and the primary suspect, who attempts to use his escape room skills to clear his name
 Zoë Chao as Zoë, Aniq's high school crush and Brett's ex-wife
 Ike Barinholtz as Brett (season 1), Zoe's ex-husband. It is later revealed he cheated on Zoë with Chelsea. 
 Ben Schwartz as Yasper (season 1), Aniq's best friend and Xavier's former ska bandmate, who hopes to start a career in music. 
 Ilana Glazer as Chelsea (season 1), a receptionist at a veterinary clinic who blamed Xavier for an incident at a St. Patrick's Day party that resulted in her ostracization by the whole school. It is revealed that a past breakup resulted in her affair with Brett. 
 Jamie Demetriou as Walt (season 1), a partygoer whom no one seems to remember 
 Dave Franco as Xavier (season 1), a pop star/actor, Yasper's former bandmate, and the murder victim, whose full name is Eugene Xavier Duckworth, Jr. 
 Elizabeth Perkins as Isabel (season 2)
 Zach Woods as Edgar (season 2)
 Paul Walter Hauser as Travis (season 2)
 Poppy Liu as Grace (season 2)
 Anna Konkle as Hannah (season 2)
 Jack Whitehall as Sebastian (season 2)
 Vivian Wu as Vivian (season 2)
 Ken Jeong as Feng (season 2)
 John Cho as Ulysses (season 2)

Recurring

 John Early as Detective Culp, Danner's partner
 Tiya Sircar as Jennifer #1, a pregnant mean girl
 Ayden Mayeri as Jennifer #2, another pregnant mean girl who goes missing upon Danner's arrival
 Genevieve Angelson as Indigo
 Kelvin Yu as Ned, Jennifer #1's husband
 Everly Carganilla as Maggie, Zoë and Brett's daughter
 Will Greenberg as Judson (season 2)
 John Gemberling as Jaxon (season 2)
In addition, Christopher May and Miracle Laurie co-star as Mr. Shapiro and Quiet Heather, respectively, a science teacher and former student who, as a running gag, are caught having intimate relations in each of the stories.

Special guest stars
 Channing Tatum as himself, who co-starred with Xavier in the Hall & Oates biopic.
 Will Forte as himself, who co-starred with Xavier in a dramatic film adaptation of the board game Hungry Hungry Hippos and was due to reprise his role in the sequel before Xavier's death.

Episodes

Season 1

Season 2

Production

Development
Miller conceived of The Afterparty in the early 2010's, where he wanted to make a murder mystery showing the different perspectives of the murder from its witnesses, inspired by his love of the murder-mystery genre and Akira Kurosawa's Rashomon. The high school reunion aspect was added after Miller attended a high school reunion himself, thinking it would be a unique setting for such a concept. Miller initially wrote it as a feature-length screenplay on his own while he was making Cloudy with a Chance of Meatballs and 21 Jump Street with Lord. The Afterparty was set-up at Sony Pictures as a film, with Miller as sole writer and director, while producing the film along with Lord, Jonathan Kadin, and Hannah Minghella. However, the film never came to fruition due to commitments with The Lego Movie and 22 Jump Street. Lord and Miller were still optimistic in making The Reunion while promoting The Lego Movie, so when Miller considered making The Afterparty, he made the decision to make it as a mini-series. Miller felt that expanding the concept into a series would allow him to properly develop the characters. Doing so also gave Miller the idea to present each version of the event as a separate genre in line with the respective POV's of each witness.

On June 24, 2020, it was announced that Apple TV+ had given the production an eight-episode straight-to-series order, now titled The Afterparty. The series is created by Miller who is also the showrunner and is expected to executive produce alongside Lord while Aubrey Lee is a producer. Production companies involved with the series were slated to consist of Sony Pictures Television and TriStar Television. On March 2, 2022, Apple TV+ renewed the series for a second season. On April 27, 2022, it was revealed that the second season would consist of ten episodes, two more than the first, and will revolve around a murder mystery at a wedding. It was also revealed Anthony King would be serving as co-showrunner along with Miller.

Casting
In November 2020, the cast was announced, including Tiffany Haddish, Sam Richardson, Ben Schwartz, Ike Barinholtz, Ilana Glazer and Dave Franco. After the first season finale aired, Schwartz revealed that he was told he would be the murderer upon being cast, and that he kept it secret from the rest of the cast until the table read for the episode.

Upon the second season renewal announcement, it was reported that Haddish is set to reprise her role as Detective Danner, but a new cast of suspects for the second season. In April 2022, it was announced that Richardson and Chao are set to reprise their roles for the second season, with Elizabeth Perkins, Zach Woods, Paul Walter Hauser, Poppy Liu, Anna Konkle, Jack Whitehall and Vivian Wu joining the starring cast as, respectively, Isabel, Edgar, Travis, Grace, Hannah, Sebastian, and Vivian. In May 2022, it was reported that Ken Jeong and John Cho were cast as series regulars for the second season. On June 13, 2022, Will Greenberg  and John Gemberling joined the cast in recurring roles for the second season.

Filming
On November 11, 2020, Miller, in an Instagram post, confirmed that filming for the series had officially begun. Miller directed all eight episodes in the series, making it the first time he has directed separately after his collaborations with Lord. In another Instagram post, on February 17, 2021, Miller revealed that filming was finished for the first season.

The sixth episode features animation done by ShadowMachine, the animation studio behind BoJack Horseman and the upcoming revival of Lord and Miller's Clone High. The animation was designed by Lindsey Olivares, who previously worked with Lord and Miller on the aesthetic design for The Mitchells vs. the Machines. The animation was done at the same time as the live-action.

Filming for the second season began on May 11, 2022 with Miller again returning as director. In an Instagram post, on September 1, 2022, Jack Whitehall confirmed that filming for the second season had wrapped.

Music
The score for The Afterparty was composed by Daniel Pemberton, who previously worked with Lord and Miller on Spider-Man: Into the Spider-Verse. In an interview with Variety, Pemberton explained the challenge of having to compose in different styles for each of the characters. He states, " It's like I'm scoring 10 films, plus a series, plus loads of incidental stuff, plus producing some songs. There was a lot on my shoulders with this project." Pemberton started work on the project by composing the main theme and the frame story outside of the flashbacks, then the music for the flashbacks. His influences on each include those of Richard Curtis films like Notting Hill for Aniq's rom-com flashback, the music of Howard Shore and Bernard Herrmann for Chelsea's psychological thriller, and the Tyler Bates' drum and guitar-heavy score of John Wick for Brett's action-movie story. The third episode is also a musical, containing three songs written by Jack Dolgen from Crazy Ex-Girlfriend and musical comedian Jon Lajoie, who worked with Lord and Miller on writing the songs for The Lego Movie 2: The Second Part. A soundtrack album with the score and songs was released alongside the first three episodes on January 28, 2022.

Another extended play album was released on February 1, 2022 featuring four songs performed by Franco in character as "Xavier" called R.I.P. Xavier.

Soundtrack

R.I.P. Xavier EP

Release
The Afterparty premiered on January 28, 2022.  The second season is scheduled to premiere on April 28, 2023, with the first two episodes available immediately and one new episode debuting on a weekly basis until the season finale on June 23, 2023.

Reception

Critical response 
The review aggregator website Rotten Tomatoes reported an 89% approval rating with an average rating of 7.6/10, based on 62 critic reviews. The website's critics consensus reads, "The Afterparty sometimes strains to keep the jamboree of yuks going, but its ambitious melding of genres and extensive guest list of actors make for a worthwhile nightcap." Metacritic, which uses a weighted average, assigned a score of 72 out of 100 based on 26 critics, indicating "generally favorable reviews".

Accolades 
At the 2022 Hollywood Critics Association TV Awards, the series was nominated for Best Streaming Series, Comedy, Sam Richardson was nominated for Best Actor in a Streaming Series, Comedy, Tiffany Haddish was nominated for Best Actress in a Streaming Series, Comedy, Ben Schwartz was nominated for Best Supporting Actor in a Streaming Series, Comedy, Christopher Miller was nominated for Best Directing in a Streaming Series, Comedy for the episode "Yasper", and Miller was also nominated for Best Writing in a Streaming Series, Comedy for the episode "Maggie".

References

External links
 

2020s American comedy television series
2020s American mystery television series
2022 American television series debuts
Apple TV+ original programming
English-language television shows
Murder in television
Television series by Sony Pictures Television
Television series created by Christopher Miller (filmmaker)
Television shows set in California
Television series set in 2021